Athiradi (Immediate or Sudden Action) is a 2015 Indian Tamil-language black comedy-action film written by Mansoor Ali Khan and directed by Balu Anand. Mansoor Ali Khan and Moumita Choudhury are in the lead roles. Produced by actor Mansoor Ali Khan under his banner "Raj Kennedy Films", the film features music composed by Mansoor Ali Khan. It was released on 16 October 2015.

Plot

Cast
 Mansoor Ali Khan
 Moumita Choudhury
 Radha Ravi
 Moolai alaghi

Soundtrack
The music was directed by Mansoor Ali Khan.

"Angusam Angusam" - Laila Ali Khan
"En Kathirikka Thottathile" - Mansoor Ali Khan, Vijaya Lakshmi
"Etho Paarka Latchanama" - Mansoor Ali Khan, Lakshmi Venkat
"Gudu Gudu Ena Odu" - Nincy
"Thalaivar Varrar Othiko" - Lakshmi Venkat
"Thanniyadichu Thanniyadichu" - Mansoor Ali Khan
"Yenda Thenna Marathathula" - Mansoor Ali Khan

References

External links
 

2015 films
Indian black comedy films
2010s Tamil-language films
2015 black comedy films
Films directed by Balu Anand